Pises Observatory is an astronomical observatory at the Parc National des Cévennes in France. It is situated at 1300 m altitude and houses an optical telescope with a charge-coupled device used for asteroid surveys.

List of discovered minor planets

See also 
 List of asteroid-discovering observatories
 List of astronomical observatories

References

External links 
 Pises Observatory
 Pises atlas

Astronomical observatories in France

Minor-planet discovering observatories